Whitewood is a closed Albertan coal mine located just north of Lake Wabamun, about sixty-five kilometres west of Edmonton, Alberta.  Owned by the TransAlta Corporation of Calgary, the mine was run by Luscar Ltd. (Edmonton) since that company acquired the extraction contract from Fording Coal Ltd. (Calgary) in 2003 until closure in 2010.

Geology
Development of the pemi site at Whitewood and the seismic testing done there in the 1980s have allowed geologists to establish the timeframe and geologic phases associated with the formation of the mine's coal bed.  Analysis has shown that there are six distinct coal seams present at Whitewood, with deposits from the late Cretaceous found at the deepest intervals, and with Early Tertiary formations found closest to the top.

A few layers of bentonitic gangue appear throughout the coal, most notably a three-metre seam near the uppermost portion of the late Cretaceous zone.  Above the twenty to seventy metre thick coal-bearing deposit lies a glacial till several metres deep; this must be removed from the surface before mining of the coal below can begin.

History
Opened in 1962, the Whitewood mine operated on a "strip" model, harvesting approximately 2.8 megatonnes of sub-bituminous coal per annum.  Most of this thermal coal was used for steam-driven power generation at the Wabamun, Sundance, and Keephills power plants, but a small amount of coal was sold to the residents of Parkland County for personal uses.

The Whitewood mine covered approximately 4700 hectares of slightly hilly prairie, with locales of forest and wetland interspersed throughout.  The 2,800,000 tonnes of coal mined there each year was enough fuel to fulfil approximately 13% of Alberta's electrical energy requirements.  As a strip-surface mine, Whitewood employed the use of heavy equipment — excavators, loaders/shovels, dumpers, and the like — to extract the coal in an efficient and cost-sensible manner.  Post-mining processing included pulverisation, to maximise thermal yields when the coal is burnt in one of the surrounding power stations.

Although the 2000s rate of extraction would have allowed the site's fifty-one million tonnes of reserves to be mined for more than a decade, TransAlta ceased production in 2010, the same year the company completed the decommissioning of its coal-fired Wabamun electrical generation facility nearby.  The company continued mining coal at the massive Highvale mine five kilometres to the southwest; that mine produces 12.9 megatonnes of sub-bituminous coal per annum, has reserves pegged at over 200 megatonnes, and will be able to fuel the power plants now served by Whitewood, in addition to the Genesee power station.

Environmental considerations

Reclamation of the mine completed in 2015. An important part of decommissioning a mine is the reclamation process that follows.  TransAlta had made provisions for renaturalisation to continue as far as 2013, three years after the Whitewood mine is slated to close.  Already, the coal-depleted portions of the site have been subject to rebeautification, with pits being reclaimed as lakes or being filled-in with backfill.  Much of the backfill land is now lain with local subsoils and rich topsoils, which make the land suitable for agricultural use; the other parts of the reclaimed land have been made into forests and wetlands in a way that is designed to reflect the pre-mining environment.

When the mine is fully out of service, the power lines, service roads, sedimentation ponds, ditches, and other mining infrastructure will be removed, and their lands reconverted to their original forms.  After the seeded vegetation takes root and grows, the mining site will hopefully show little evidence of having hosted a mine.

References

 
 

Coal mines in Canada
Mines in Alberta
Parkland County
Surface mines in Canada
1962 establishments in Alberta